Garra arupi is a species of cyprinid fish in the genus Garra from the upper Brahmaputra basin in Arunachal Pradesh.

Etymology
The fish is named in honor of Arup Kumar Das (b. 1952), the Coordinator of the University Grant Commission-sponsored “Centre of Excellence in Biodiversity” of the Rajiv Gandhi University, in Itanagar, India.

References 

Garra
Taxa named by Kongbrailatpan Nebeshwar Sharma
Taxa named by Waikhom Vishwanath
Taxa named by Debangshu Narayan Das
Fish described in 2009